Dulaj Dananjaya (born 18 November 1992) is a Sri Lankan cricketer. He made his Twenty20 debut on 14 March 2021, for Panadura Sports Club in the 2020–21 SLC Twenty20 Tournament.

References

External links
 

1992 births
Living people
Sri Lankan cricketers
Panadura Sports Club cricketers
Place of birth missing (living people)